Princess Ana (1723-1780) was a Georgian royal princess of the Bagrationi dynasty from the Kakhetian branch.

She was a daughter of King Ali Mirza of Kakheti.

Ana married in Moscow, c. 1743, Prince Pyotr Igorovich Dadianov (15 June 1716 – 7 December 1784), captain of the Imperial Russian army, who was from the Georgian noble family of Dadiani.

They had 4 children:
Alexandre Petrovitch Dadianov (1753-1811)
Ekaterina Petrovna Dadianova (1743-1769)
Olga Petrovna Dadianova (1750-1820)
Elisaveta Petrovna Dadianova (1750-1814)

Ana died on 19 March 1780 in Moscow.

References

1723 births
1780 deaths
Bagrationi dynasty of the Kingdom of Kakheti
Princesses from Georgia (country)